Tim Christopher Oberdorf (born 16 August 1996) is a German professional footballer who plays as a centre-back for  club Fortuna Düsseldorf.

Personal life
Oberdorf's sister Lena Oberdorf, also a footballer, plays for the Germany national team.

References

External links

1996 births
Living people
German footballers
Sportspeople from Hagen
Footballers from North Rhine-Westphalia
Association football central defenders
TSG Sprockhövel players
Fortuna Düsseldorf II players
Fortuna Düsseldorf players
2. Bundesliga players
Regionalliga players
Oberliga (football) players